The culpeo (Lycalopex culpaeus), also known as culpeo zorro, Andean zorro, Andean fox, Paramo wolf, Andean wolf, and colpeo fox, is a species of South American fox. Regardless of the name, it is not a true fox, but more closely related to wolves and jackals. Its appearance resembles that of foxes due to convergent evolution.

It is the second-largest native canid on the continent after the maned wolf. In appearance, it bears many similarities to the widely recognized red fox. It has grey and reddish fur, a white chin, reddish legs and a stripe on its back that may be barely visible.

The culpeo's diet consists largely of rodents, rabbits, birds and lizards, and to a lesser extent, plant material and carrion. They may prey on Andean flamingos and baby vicuña. The culpeo occasionally attacks sheep and is, therefore, often hunted or poisoned. In some regions, it has become rare, but overall the species is not threatened with extinction.

The culpeo was domesticated by the Selk'nam people of Tierra del Fuego, producing the Fuegian dog which became extinct in the late 19th or early 20th century.

Description

The culpeo is a canid intermediate in size between a red fox and a coyote. Overall, a weight range of  has been reported. The pelt has a grizzled appearance. The neck and shoulders are often tawny to rufous in color, while the upper back is dark. The bushy tail has a black tip.

Range

The culpeo's range extends from the southern regions of Patagonia and Tierra del Fuego in the south to Ecuador and Peru in the north, with some populations extending into southern Colombia. It is also found in the Sierras Grandes mountain range in Córdoba, Argentina. It is most common on the western slopes of the Andes, where it inhabits open country and deciduous forests.

Habitat
The culpeo lives in a wide variety of habitats of western South America. They are found in broadleaf Nothofagus temperate rainforest, sclerophyllous matorral, deserts, chaparrals, and plateaus, like the Altiplano, up to the tree line.

Diet

The culpeo is an opportunistic predator that will take any variety of prey. It mainly feeds on rodents (including common degus) and lagomorphs (especially the introduced European rabbit and European hare); however, it occasionally feeds on domestic livestock and young guanacos. They will also feed on insects, birds, lizards, fruit, and carrion of llamas and vicuñas. Culpeos are considered beneficial because they are significant predators of the rabbits introduced in 1915; such introduced rabbit populations are believed to have allowed culpeos to spread from the Andean foothills across the Patagonian plain. They sometimes take young lambs up to 1 week old. In limited studies, the larger culpeo appears to dominate potential competitors, including South American gray foxes, Geoffroy's cats, pampas cats, grisons and various raptorial birds. Its range also overlaps that of the much larger puma, but the size difference ensures that the two species have limited competition. They are known to eat the carcasses of vicuñas. Culpeos have also been observed preying upon introduced beavers.
During a period of drought in central Chile's scrublands lagomorphs, coati, goats, and cattle make up a large amount of their diet,
but it is unknown if cattle is hunted or scavenged.

Reproduction
The typical mating period is between August and October. After a gestation period of 55–60 days, the female gives birth usually to between two and five pups.

Classification

Subspecies

Taxonomy
The taxonomy of the culpeo has been the topic of debate due to their high phenetic variability and the scarcity of research, among other things. Over the past three decades, they have been placed variably in the genera Dusicyon (Clutton-Brock, et al., 1976; Wozencraft, 1989), Canis (Langguth, 1975; Van Gelder, 1978), Pseudalopex (Berta, 1987; Wozencraft, 1993; Tedford et al., 1995) and Lycalopex (Zunino, 1995; Wozencraft, 2005).

This canid, like other South American foxes, is still sometimes classified as a member of the genus Pseudalopex. As Pseudalopex and Lycalopex have largely come to describe the same genus, either classification is acceptable, although the modern practice is to give Lycalopex prominence.

References

South American foxes
Mammals of the Andes
Mammals of Patagonia
Mammals of Argentina
Mammals of Bolivia
Mammals of Chile
Mammals of Colombia
Mammals of Ecuador
Mammals of Peru
Fauna of Tierra del Fuego
Fauna of the Falkland Islands
Carnivorans of South America
Mammals described in 1782
Least concern biota of South America